Jan Shepard (born Josephine Angela Sorbello) is a retired American actress.

Early years
Josephine Angela Sorbello was born in Quakertown, Pennsylvania in 1928 to parents of Sicilian descent, Mr. and Mrs. Sam Sorbello.  She was valedictorian of her class at Quakertown High School, and acted in plays produced locally.

Career

Shepard honed her acting skills at the Pasadena Playhouse. She appeared in the films Sabre Jet, as well as King Creole (1958) and Paradise, Hawaiian Style (1966) with Elvis Presley, thus before and after his Army induction and his mother's death. She played Nurse Betty in the syndicated television series Dr. Christian and appeared in the television series  Waterfront, Bat Masterson, The Man Behind the Badge, Tales of the Texas Rangers, Private Secretary, Dr. Christian, Rawhide, Laramie, Perry Mason, Highway Patrol, Gunsmoke, Tombstone Territory, The High Chaparral  and The Virginian, among others.

References

External links

 

Living people
American people of Italian descent
20th-century American actresses
21st-century American actresses
American television actresses
American film actresses
Western (genre) film actresses
Western (genre) television actors
Actresses from Pennsylvania
People from Quakertown, Pennsylvania
Year of birth missing (living people)
People of Sicilian descent